In enzymology, a methionine S-methyltransferase is an enzyme that catalyzes the chemical reaction

S-adenosyl-L-methionine + L-methionine  S-adenosyl-L-homocysteine + S-methyl-L-methionine

Thus, the two substrates of this enzyme are S-adenosyl methionine and L-methionine, whereas its two products are S-adenosylhomocysteine and S-methyl-L-methionine.

This enzyme belongs to the family of transferases, specifically those transferring one-carbon group methyltransferases.  The systematic name of this enzyme class is S-adenosyl-L-methionine:L-methionine S-methyltransferase. Other names in common use include S-adenosyl methionine:methionine methyl transferase, methionine methyltransferase, S-adenosylmethionine transmethylase, and S-adenosylmethionine-methionine methyltransferase.  This enzyme participates in selenoamino acid metabolism.  It has 2 cofactors: manganese,  and zinc.

References

 

EC 2.1.1
Manganese enzymes
Zinc enzymes
Enzymes of unknown structure